Still Stuck in Your Throat is a 2006 studio album by Fishbone, and their most recent full-length release to date. It was their first album since Fishbone and the Familyhood Nextperience Present: The Psychotic Friends Nuttwerx had been released six years previously, as well as their first to be released on an independent record label. It is also the first album to feature guitarist Rocky George, keyboardist Dre Gipson and trumpeter Curtis Storey, as well as their first to not feature founding member Walter A. Kibby II, who left the band in 2003, having since returned. Still Stuck in Your Throat was recorded in late 2005 and early 2006 with the support of David Kahne who produced all of Fishbone's recordings during the 1980s and early 1990s. Featuring five songs that were written during the unreleased "Hen House" sessions of 2001 (some songs of which appear on the live recording Live at the Temple Bar and More), the new album also contains six brand new tracks.

Track listing

Personnel

Fishbone
Angelo Moore – vocals, saxophones, theremin, percussion
Curtis Storey – trumpet, vocals
Rocky George – guitar
John McKnight – keyboards, trombone, guitar, vocals
Dre Gipson – keyboards, vocals
John Norwood Fisher – bass guitar, vocals
John Steward – drums

Additional
Jimmy Sloan – slide guitar on "Forever Moore", additional guitar on "Jackass Brigade" and "Faceplant"
Robbie Gennet – organ on "Forever Moore", piano on "Faceplant"
Kidd Merv – trumpet on "Forever Moore" and "Faceplant"
I Timothy – trombone on "Forever Moore" and "Faceplant"
Kim Manning – background vocals on "We Just Lose Our Minds"
Bronx Style Bob – harmonies and background vocals on "We Just Lose Our Minds"
Roger Dexter – announcer on "Let Dem Ho's Fight"

Engineers
David Kahne – mixing
Jimmy Sloan – tracking, recording
JK Potter – photography

References

2006 albums
Fishbone albums